Najaf is a city in Iraq.

Najaf may also refer to:

Places 
 Najaf Governorate, a province in Iraq
 Najaf, Iran, a village in North Khorasan Province, Iran
 Najaf-e Tarakomeh, a village in East Azerbaijan Province, Iran
 Najaf Abad, a city in Isfahan Province, Iran
 Nadjaf Al Ashraf, Senegal

People 
 Najaf Shah (born 1984), Pakistani first-class cricketer
 Najaf bey Vazirov (1854–1926), Azerbaijani playwright and journalist
 Najaf Abbas Sial (1959–2018), Pakistani politician
 Mirza Najaf Khan (1733–1782), Persian adventurer

Sport 
 Najaf FC, an Iraqi football club based in Najaf, Iraq
 An-Najaf Stadium, a multi-use stadium in Najaf, Iraq

Other uses 
 Battle of Najaf (disambiguation), several battles during the Iraq War
 Najaf governorate election, 2009
 Al Najaf International Airport, airport serving Najaf, Iraq